The 2018 Alsco 300 was the 11th stock car race of the 2018 NASCAR Xfinity Series season and the 37th iteration of the event. The race was held on Saturday, May 26, 2018, in Concord, North Carolina at Charlotte Motor Speedway, a 1.5 miles (2.4 km) permanent quad-oval. The race was extended from 200 laps to 204 due to a NASCAR overtime finish. At race's end, Brad Keselowski of Team Penske would win the race under caution, as Tyler Reddick and Ty Majeski would both wreck on the backstretch on the final lap, putting out a caution. The win was Keselowski's 38th career NASCAR Xfinity Series win and his second of the season. To fill out the podium, Cole Custer of Stewart-Haas Racing with Biagi-DenBeste and Christopher Bell of Joe Gibbs Racing would finish second and third, respectively.

Background 

The race was held at Charlotte Motor Speedway, located in Concord, North Carolina. The speedway complex includes a 1.5-mile (2.4 km) quad-oval track that was utilized for the race, as well as a dragstrip and a dirt track. The speedway was built in 1959 by Bruton Smith and is considered the home track for NASCAR with many race teams based in the Charlotte metropolitan area. The track is owned and operated by Speedway Motorsports Inc. (SMI) with Marcus G. Smith serving as track president.

Entry list

Practice

First practice 
The first practice session would occur on Thursday, May 24, at 4:05 PM EST, and would last for 50 minutes.

Second and final practice 
The second and final practice session, sometimes referred to as Happy Hour, would occur on Thursday, May 24, at 6:05 PM EST, and would last for 45 minutes.

Qualifying 
Qualifying would occur on Saturday, May 26, at 10:10 AM EST. Since Charlotte Motor Speedway is under 2 miles (3.2 km), the qualifying system was a multi-car system that included three rounds. The first round was 15 minutes, where every driver would be able to set a lap within the 15 minutes. Then, the second round would consist of the fastest 24 cars in Round 1, and drivers would have 10 minutes to set a lap. Round 3 consisted of the fastest 12 drivers from Round 2, and the drivers would have 5 minutes to set a time. Whoever was fastest in Round 3 would win the pole.

Full qualifying results

Race results 
Stage 1 Laps: 45

Stage 2 Laps: 45

Stage 3 Laps: 114

References 

2018 NASCAR Xfinity Series
NASCAR races at Charlotte Motor Speedway
May 2018 sports events in the United States
2018 in sports in North Carolina